Wagle Ki Duniya – Nayi Peedhi Naye Kissey is an Indian sitcom that premiered on 8 February 2021 on Sony SAB. It is based on characters created by noted cartoonist, R. K. Laxman, especially the common man about the issues of the common middle-class Indian man and serves as a sequel to Wagle Ki Duniya which aired on Doordarshan. It stars Sumeet Raghavan, Pariva Pranati, Anjan Srivastav, Bharati Achrekar, Sheehan Kapahi and Chinmayee Salvi.

Overview 
The show is based around the daily struggles of courier company manager Rajesh Srinivas Wagle, who lives with the prudence of a middle-class person of the time. The show presents the everyday struggles of the people from three generations and multiple families from their perspectives acting like a members of a single family. They try to clear the struggles between everyone, acting like a whole. The show gives social message in most of its episodes through humor and emotions.

Cast

Main 
Sumeet Raghavan as Rajesh "Raju"/"Raj" Wagle – A manager of a courier service company P2P Glocal; Srinivas and Radhika's younger son; Manoj's brother; Archana's cousin; Vandana's husband; Sakhi and Atharva’s father. He loves his family and wants to hold them together. He often has weird daydreams which result in embarrassment. The only people he despises are Maya and Harry from his office, who try to come up with various tricks to compete with him. When he gets indecisive, he asks the person who is standing with him to choose one of his fingers as an option. He explains things practically with examples. He always tries to solve things without fighting and helps others. (2021–present)
Pariva Pranati as Vandana "Vandu" Sinha Wagle – Mahadevi's niece; Rinku's cousin; Rajesh's wife; Sakhi and Atharva's mother. She is an orphan and was raised by her uncle and aunt. She was a homemaker earlier but now is a self-employed woman. She deals with every problem calmly and is kind-hearted. She often loses her temper at Atharva whenever he troubles her but loves him a lot. She was a chef before marriage but left her job because she kept in mind her duties to her family. (2021–present)
Anjan Srivastav as Srinivas Wagle – Prabhakar's brother; Radhika's husband; Manoj and Rajesh's father; Sakhi and Atharva's grandfather. His fondness for his old things irritates his wife, Radhika. He sometimes asks silly questions to Radhika and Vandana. He often compares Borivali to his beloved hometown Dadar. He is generous, kind, and helpful. He had a tiff with Anna, who opposed Rajesh's love marriage, but they sorted things out later on (2021–present).
Bharati Achrekar as 
Radhika Gokhale Wagle – Anna and Ruby's sister; Srinivas's wife; Manoj and Rajesh's mother; Sakhi and Atharva's grandmother. She is fed up with her husband's love for his old possessions but loves him nonetheless. She wanted to be a soap opera actress in her childhood, but her father did not give her permission. (2021–present)
Ruby Gokhale – Radhika’s twin sister, Rajesh’s aunt. (2022)
Chinmayee Salvi as Sakhi Wagle – Rajesh and Vandana's daughter; Atharva's sister; Gungun's best friend. She is named after Rajesh's childhood crush Madhura Joshi whom he call Sakhi. She is intelligent and responsible but is sometimes rebellious. Rajesh doesn't like that she has a crush on her friend Vivaan. She is sometimes ill-influenced by her classmate Anvita, who is jealous of the fact that Vivaan is getting closer to Sakhi. (2021–present)
Sheehan Kapahi as Atharva Wagle – Rajesh and Vandana's son; Sakhi's brother; Vidyut's best friend. He is a mischievous yet intelligent boy. He is the family's troublemaker and often draws unwanted conclusions from the elder's teachings. He dearly loves his family. (2021–present)

Recurring 
Deepak Pareek as Honourable Secretary Advocate Dakshesh "Dakku" Joshipura – The stubborn secretary of Sai Darshan Heights Society; Yamini's husband; Kittu's adoptive father. He and his family are Gujaratis. He annoys everyone due to his pedantic nature. He has a catchphrase, "Rules Matlab Rules, Follow Na Kare Te Fools, Fools Go Back To Schools!", if anyone disobeys social rules. He regards Vandana as a goddess. He regrets not having a child but later adopted an orphan named Kittu. (2021–present).
Manasi Joshi as Dr. Yamini "Yam" Mehta Joshipura – Naivedya's sister; Dakshesh's wife; Kittu's adoptive mother. She is a theatre artist. She often quotes boring and irritating dialogues from Hindi and Gujarati plays, which no one except Dakshesh likes. Yamini often regrets that she does not have children but later she adopted a girl named Kittu. She calls Kittu as Pari out of affection.(2021–present).
Amit Soni as Harshad Agrawal – One of the Wagles' neighbours; Rajesh's close friend; Jyoti's husband; Gungun and Vidyut's father. He is a rich but egoistic stock market trader. He often uses corrupted methods to gain profit in business and lands in trouble, from which he is always corrected by Rajesh and thus considers him as his mentor. He often bosses Jyoti and is conservative about his daughter Gungun and does not approve of her crush on her friend Shikhar.(2021–present).
Bhakti Chauhan as Jyoti Gupta Agrawal – Yamini and Vandana's friend; Harshad's wife; Gungun and Vidyut's mother. She always translates what Harshad is saying whenever he is eating mouth fresheners. She is helpful and often shows off her and her family members' luxury. She is innocent and her husband often forces her to obey all his orders. She always keeps her purse full of unusual objects.(2021–present)
Prapti Shukla as Gungun Agrawal – Jyoti and Harshad's daughter; Vidyut's sister; Sakhi's best friend. Shikar's Girlfriend. She is a helpful girl but sometimes gets influenced by her friend circle.(2021–present)
Hitanshu Nagia as Vidyut Agrawal – Jyoti and Harshad's son; Gungun's brother; Atharva's best friend. He loves to show off his luxury like his mother and often makes fun of Atharva about the punishments he gets for causing trouble or pranking.(2021–present)
Mahi Soni as Kittu Joshipura – Dakshesh and Yamini's adopted daughter. She reached to Sai Darshan Heights after escaping from a child trafficking gang who abducted her from an orphanage in Hyderabad. She has been rescued, and Dakshesh and Yamini have legally adopted her.(2022–present)
Namit Shah as Vivaan Dwivedi – Sakhi's college friend; Anvita's boyfriend. He was brought up in the USA. Rajesh suspects him to be Sakhi's boyfriend, which he is not; but Sakhi does have a crush on him. He is helpful and has a positive attitude.(2021–present).
Suryakant Govale as Chandu Parab – A staff member in Rajesh's courier office who always helps him.(2021–present)
Nayan Shukla as Ghanshyam Dasani – A staff member in Rajesh's courier office. He is lazy towards his office work and always eats food from everyone's tiffin. He is a selfish yet funny person who is jealous of Rajesh and tries to take credit for work done by others.(2021–present).
Anju Jadhav as Kiara Tejwani – The CEO of the courier service P2P Glocal; Tejwani's daughter. She pretends to be cold-hearted and strict but is sweet. She understands her employees' problems. After the BRS bank scam, she sold the company to Harry Khatri, owner of the Glocal Packers company.(2021–present).
Vinayak Ketkar as Manish Marfatia – Hotel manager of Treat Resort in Silvassa. He always says "I know, I know", even when he does not know anything. He later resigns as the resort manager and joins P2P Max Courier Service company.(2021–present).
Khushali Jariwala as Munmun Chatterjee – Catering manager at Treat Resort, and love-interest of Manish Marfatia. She gives the leftover food to poor people. She was often accused of theft by Dakshesh when his family was staying at the resort.(2021).
Urmila Katkar as Asha Tipnis – Sai Darshan Heights Society's maid; Dilip's wife; Komal's mother. She is fond of gossip and is trying to learn English.(2021–present).
Satyavrat Mudgal as Ganpat Rao Tiwari – Sai Darshan Heights Society's watchman whom Dakshesh scolds often.(2021–present).
Dhwani Hetal Parmar as Komal Tipnis – Asha and Dilip's daughter (2021)
Amit Verma as Nikesh "Nick" Agarwal – Harshad's cousin. He lives in America and came to India for the proposal of an arranged marriage with Kiara Tejwani, Rajesh's colleague.(2022–present)
Preeti Kochar as Mahadevi Tripathi – Vandana's aunt; Sakhi and Atharva's grandaunt. She and her husband brought up Vandana when she was orphaned. She is constantly telling Vandana to take up a job, so that she too can financially contribute to her family, and become the second bread-earner. (2022–present).
Riya Soni as Anvita Jain – Vivaan's girlfriend; Sakhi's college friend. She always wants to seek Vivaan's attention and is insecure about his friendship with Sakhi. She sometimes ill-influences Sakhi out of jealousy.(2021–present).
Sushant Singh as Shikhar Patel – Sakhi's college friend; Gungun's boyfriend .(2021–present).
Nabil Parkar as Soumil Ahuja – Sakhi and Gungun's college friend; Trupti's nephew.(2021–present)
Ambar Bedi as Maya Ahlawat – Vandana's college friend, Rajesh's rival and P2P Glocal Packers staff member. Earlier she was a journalist and unintentionally created a rift between Vandana and her mother-in-law Radhika but later Rajesh and his friends taught her a lesson, after which she mended her ways. However, a few days later she was fired from her job and was also divorced, so she joined P2P Glocal Packers in order to avenge Rajesh as she blames him for her fate. After this, she always tries to get Rajesh and his colleagues in trouble.(2021–present).
Vikas Grover as Harry Khatri – He is the owner of the courier service P2P Glocal, after merging Tejwani's company P2P Max Courier with his previous own company Glocal Packers.(2022–present).
Prabhackar Sinha as Arjun Swaroop – A hotel staff and junior to Mr. Marfatia at Treat Resort.(2021).
Suhail Iqbal as Mr. Tejwani –Rajesh's boss and Kiara's father. He is the previous owner of P2P Max Courier company, but is now retired, and is a divorcee. The company is now run by his daughter Kiara.(2021).
Nayana Apte Joshi as Kishori – Radhika's best friend.(2021–present).
 Tulika Patel as Trupti Ahuja – Harshad's ex-girlfriend; Soumil's aunt.(2021-2022).
 Akshay Sharma as Tushar Dalvi - Atharva classmate.(2023)
 Milky Srivastav as Khushi Tarachand – Atharva and Vidyut classmate.(2021–present)
 Vipul Deshpande as Manoj"Manu" Wagle – Srinivas and Radhika's elder son; Rajesh's elder brother,Sakhi and Atharva's uncle Vidya's ex-boyfriend (2023–present)
Sunkanya Surve as Vidya Kulkarni; Manoj's ex-girlfriend (2023-Present),a divorcee who has left behind a bad marriage with her son’s support. 
 Sarmukh Singh as Amar Singh - Atharva classmate.(2023)

Guest appearances 
Nimisha Vakharia as Rekha Gondhalekar – Radhika's old maid. She won a lottery of ₹50 million, and became immensely rich after leaving Radhika's place.(2021)
Deven Bhojani as Balkrishna 'Anna' Gokhale – Radhika and Ruby's elder brother who was on non-talking terms with Srinivas for 18 years. He was against the love marriage of Rajesh and Vandana. Srinivas broke his relationship with him. But later, Anna realises that Vandana is a perfect wife. He reties his bonds with Srinivas and thus, things get sorted.(2021)
Manas Shah as Randeep Walia – Popular TV actor; Priya's brother. He came to Treat Resort for shooting. His sister, Dr. Priya Walia was a look-alike of Sakhi and died due to COVID-19. (2021)
Amita Khopkar as Mrs. Walia – Priya and Randeep's mother.(2021)
Ojas Rawal as Naivedya Mehta – Yamini's brother. He is the owner of Treat Resort, situated in Silvassa. He makes fun of Dakshesh and all the Sai Darshan Heights residents. He only cares about his sister. He teasingly calls Dakshesh as 'Mendakshesh'.(2021-2022)
Kalpesh Chauhan as Gulaabdas Rawal – Co-owner of Treat Resort.(2021)
Apurva Gore as Aashka – Nishant's wife. She and her fiancé, Nishant got married at Treat Resort amidst lockdown restrictions.(2021)
Vivek Kaul as Nishant – Aashka's husband. He and his fiancée, Aashka got married at Treat Resort amidst lockdown restrictions.(2021) 
Bakhtiyaar Irani as Jamie Paul – A professional photographer who molests Sakhi in the name of making her a famous model. (2023)
 Abhishek Awasthi as Ravi "Rinku" Sinha – Vandana's cousin; Raghu's father. He is a farmer and is irritated by Atharva for the same. However, Atharva reconciles with him learning his past. Later, He is revealed to be a reputed agricultural scientist. (2022)
 Madhura Joshi as Archana Wagle Chinoy – Prabhakar's daughter; Rajesh's cousin; Vivek's wife. She is Rajesh's cousin from Nashik who came to Mumbai to get married after her mother-in-law's illness. Later with Sakhi's help, she and Vivek tried to flee from the wedding to get married after knowing about the true shades of her greedy father-in-law who secretly pressurizes her father for dowry. (2022)
 Rahul Krishna Arora as Vivek Chinoy – Janardhan and Sukanya's son; Archana's husband. (2022)
 Arvind Wahi as Janardhan Chinoy – Sukanya's husband; Vivek's father. He is a greedy person who secretly pressurized Prabhakar for dowry and have Archana and Vivek's marriage in Mumbai. (2022)
 Chaitali Jadhav as Sukanya Chinoy – Janardhan's wife; Vivek's mother. She stood up against her husband and helped Archana and Vivek. (2022)
Ajji as Kalyani Mausi – She is Rajesh's distant aunt from Radhika's village, who is very conventional in her thinking and always taunts innovative thinking when she visits Sai Darshan Heights society.(2021-2022)
Vinay Yedekar as Ashwin Chitre – Rajesh's best friend who established a business in Dubai and hadn't talked to him for years.(2021)
Simran Khanna as Monica Palekar / Sukanya Palekar – Sudhir's daughter; Rajesh's childhood friend. She was a fat girl and was inspired to loss weight after Rajesh once taunted her in his childhood.(2021)
Utpal Dashora as Suryakant Bhosle – Rajesh's friend who followed his passion and became a famous painter. Now settled in France.(2022)
Payal Sharma as Niyati – Director of Dishwasher's ad, for which she selected Radhika and Vandana.(2021)
Karan Grover as Arnav Sachdev – He starred with Vandana and Radhika in an advertisement.(2021)
Devendra Mishra as Inspector M. Tripathi.
Aditi Sanwal as Dr. Prabha Shah – Gungun's doctor. She is a widowed mother of a six-year-old boy as she lost her husband due to COVID-19. She attempts suicide due to death threats on social media following a post by Harshad Agrawal owing to a misunderstanding.(2022)
Rakhi Sawant as Begum Chorni
Ketan Singh as Badshah Chor 
Tunisha Sharma as Inspector  Aditi Jammwal from Hero – Gayab Mode On
Gulki Joshi as Inspector  Haseena Malik aka Maddam Sir from Maddam Sir. She appeared in episode 291 to explain the importance of safety of girls in the society.
Simple Kaul as Koyal Roy – Cadet of Parakram SAF from Ziddi Dil Maane Na.
Nirbhay Thakur as Nikhil Roy – Koyal's son from Ziddi Dil Maane Na.
Karan Veer Mehra as Abhay – Koyal's husband from Ziddi Dil Maane Na.
Shaleen Malhotra as Special Agent Karan Shergill from Ziddi Dil Maane Na.
Kaveri Priyam as Dr. Monami Mahajan – Cadet of Parakram SAF and Koyal's friend from Ziddi Dil Maane Na.
Karuna Pandey as Pushpa Patel  from Pushpa Impossible.

Production 
The show is produced by Jamnadas Majethia and Aatish Kapadia of Hats Off Productions. The show was first teased featuring Sumeet Raghavan on Sony SAB's official YouTube channel on 5 December 2020. The show has been given a special COVID-19 touch.

The shooting of the show was halted in April 2021 after eight people reportedly tested positive for COVID-19. Fresh episodes started airing on 26 April, with episodes being shot in Silvassa. Towards the end of June, shooting restarted in Mumbai.

In August 2021, Deven Bhojani was cast, reprising his role of Anna from Sony SAB's show Bhakarwadi.

Crossover
The Big Shanivaar is crossover of all Sony SAB (except Taarak Mehta Ka Ooltah Chashmah) shows telecasting at that time on 9 October 2021 to promote Sony SAB telecasting their shows on Saturday also.

The Big Shanivaar is crossover of all Sony SAB (except Taarak Mehta Ka Ooltah Chashmah) shows telecasting at that time on 20 November 2021 on the occasion of Diwali in Parakram SAF (Ziddi Dil Maane Na) and to help its Cadet Koel Roy in escaping from her husband.

Shaam Shaandar is the New Year special, a one-hour special episode on 31 December 2021 along with Ziddi Dil Maane Na and Maddam Sir.

A one-hour special crossover with Pushpa Impossible from 12 September 2022 to 13 September 2022.

Awards and nominations

References

External links 

 Wagle Ki Duniya – Nayi Peedhi Naye Kissey
 Wagle Ki Duniya – Nayi Peedhi Naye Kissey

2020s Indian television series
2021 Indian television series debuts
Indian comedy television series
Sony SAB original programming